Quaterpyridine refers to a family of pyridine derivatives with the formula (NC5H4-C5H3N)2.  These compounds can also be viewed as bipyridine decorated with two pyridyl substituents.  Several isomers are known.  All are colorless solids.  One particular isomer, 2,2':6',2'':6'',2'''-quaterpyridine, a derivative of 2,2'-bipyridine has attracted interest because it is a potential tetradentate ligand in coordination chemistry.

Related compounds
terpyridine

References

Chelating agents
Pyridines
Heterocyclic compounds with 4 rings